Greenwood Cemetery is a cemetery in Montgomery, Alabama, United States.

Notable interments include:
 John Abercrombie, U.S. Congressman
 Bibb Graves, 38th Governor of Alabama
 Dixie Bibb Graves, U.S. Senator and First Lady of Alabama
 J. Lister Hill, U.S. Congressman and Senator
 Reuben Kolb, Alabama's commissioner of agriculture
 William R. Lawley, Jr., United States Army Air Forces officer and Medal of Honor recipient
 Gordon Persons, 43rd Governor of Alabama
 John C. C. Sanders, Civil War Confederate Brigadier General
 George Wallace, 45th Governor of Alabama
 Lurleen Burns Wallace, 46th Governor of Alabama, First Lady of Alabama

References

External links
 
 
 

Cemeteries in Montgomery, Alabama
Cemeteries established in the 1900s
1901 establishments in Alabama